James Byron Bissett is a Canadian former diplomat. He was High Commissioner to Trinidad and Tobago and later Ambassador Extraordinary and Plenipotentiary to Yugoslavia, Albania, and Bulgaria.

Career 
James Bissett joined the Canadian government in 1956. He spent the next 36 years as a public servant in the Departments of Citizenship and Immigration and Foreign Affairs. In 1974 he was appointed head of the Immigration Foreign services. During the early 1970s he served at the Canadian High Commission in London, England. In 1980 he became the assistant undersecretary of state for social affairs in the Department of External Affairs. Two years later he was appointed the Canadian High Commissioner to Trinidad and Tobago, where he remained until 1985. He was then seconded to the Department of Employment and Immigration as executive director, to help steer new immigration and refugee legislation through the Parliament of Canada. In 1990 he was then appointed Canadian Ambassador to Yugoslavia, Bulgaria and Albania. In the summer of 1992 he was recalled from there and retired from foreign service, to accept a job as the head of the International Organization for Migration in Moscow, helping the Russian government establish a new immigration agency and implementing settlement programs for Russians returning to Russia from other parts of the former Soviet Union. He returned to Canada in 1997.

After the break-up of Yugoslavia
Bissett has been a consistent defender of Serb leader Slobodan Milošević and critic of Western policies in the former Yugoslavia. He testified at the Trial of Slobodan Milošević as a defence witness. In 2004, Bissett claimed that "Canada [has] participated in a series of NATO-sanctioned war crimes against Yugoslavia". He also said that "anti-Serb violence had taken place while an army of 18,000 NATO troops stood by and did nothing to protect the Serbs or their property."

Media
James Bissett appears in two documentary films by Boris Malagurski: Kosovo: Can You Imagine? (2009) and The Weight of Chains (2011).

External links 
 Foreign Affairs and International Trade Canada Complete List of Posts

References

Year of birth missing (living people)
Living people
Carleton University alumni
People from Deloraine, Manitoba
High Commissioners of Canada to Trinidad and Tobago
Ambassadors of Canada to Yugoslavia
Ambassadors of Canada to Albania
Ambassadors of Canada to Bulgaria